The Jacqueline Lake (French: Lac Jacqueline) is a fresh body of water from the catchment area of the Rivière aux Écorces, of the Pikauba River and Saguenay River, in the unorganized territory of Lac-Jacques-Cartier, in the La Côte-de-Beaupré Regional County Municipality, in the administrative region of Capitale-Nationale, in the province of Quebec, in Canada.

The area around the lake is served indirectly by the route 175 which passes on the east side, for the needs of recreational tourism activities, especially vacationing. A secondary forest road passes between Lake Jacqueline and Lake Germain.

Forestry is the main economic activity in the sector; recreational tourism, second.

The surface of Lake Jacqueline is usually frozen from the beginning of December to the end of March, however the safe circulation on the ice is generally made from mid-December to mid-March.

Geography 
The main watersheds near Lake Jacqueline are:
 north side: Rivière aux Écorces North-East, Simard stream, Madeleine stream, Pikauba River;
 east side: Pies stream, Hell stream, Pikauba River, rivière aux Écorces North-East;
 south side: Launière River, Launière lake, Cavée River, Jacques-Cartier North-West River;
 west side: Delphis brook, Joyal brook, rivière aux Écorces du Milieu, rivière aux Écorces North-East, Kane brook, Gravel brook.

This lake is mainly fed by riparian streams, by the outlet (coming from the east) of Lory Lake and by a stream (coming from the southeast). The dam at the mouth of Jacqueline Lake is located to the northwest, at:
  south-east of the confluence of the outlet of Lake Jacqueline and the Rivière aux Écorces North-East;
  north-east of Franchère Lake;
  north-west of the dam at the mouth of Honorine Lake which is the head lake of the Launière River;
  south-west of the course of the Pikauba River;
  south-west of route 175;
  north-east of the confluence of the Rivière aux Écorces North-East and the Rivière aux Écorces.

Toponymy 
The term "Jacqueline" is a first name of French origin.

The toponym "Lac Jacqueline" was formalized on December 5, 1968, by the Commission de toponymie du Québec.

References

See also 
 La Côte-de-Beaupré Regional County Municipality
 Lac-Jacques-Cartier, a TNO
 Saguenay River
 Chicoutimi River
 Kenogami Lake
 Pikauba River
 Rivière aux Écorces
 Rivière aux Écorces North-East
 List of lakes of Canada

Lakes of Capitale-Nationale
La Côte-de-Beaupré Regional County Municipality
Laurentides Wildlife Reserve